Jane Hawkes  is a British art historian. She is a Professor of History of Art at the University of York specialising in the art and sculpture of the Anglo-Saxon period.

Career
Hawkes completed her PhD funded by a British Academy scholarship on the "Iconography of Anglo-Saxon sculpture of the pre-Viking period in the North of England". She subsequently worked on a 2-year post-Doctoral fellowship at the University of Newcastle. She has taught at the Universities of Newcastle, Edinburgh, and the National University of Ireland at University College Cork. She is one of the co-investigators of the Corpus of Anglo-Saxon Stone Sculpture project.

She was elected as a fellow of the Society of Antiquaries in December 2017.

In April 2018, Hawkes delivered The Jennifer O'Reilly Memorial Lecture at the University of Cork.

References

Living people
Fellows of the Society of Antiquaries of London
British women archaeologists
British women historians
Year of birth missing (living people)
Women art historians